Cromok is a Malaysian rock band. They are known to be the pioneers of Malaysian thrash metal music. Formed in 1987, original and current members consists of Shamsudin "Sam" Ali (vocals and bass), Khairul Anuar "Karl" Shariff (guitarist), and Tarmizi "Miji" Mokhtar (drummer). The band best known for their songs "Misty", "Another You", "I Don't Belong Here" and has released 8 studio albums to date. Fans of Cromok were dubbed as 'Cromers'.

History
Cromok was formed in April 1987 by four young students, Kharuddin Muhammad (Din), Shamsuddin Ali (Sam), Khairul Anuar Shariff (Karl) and Tarmizi Mokhtar (Miji). Din who was the senior among them, was instrumental in developing the musical and visual style of what is to be Cromok. They were studying at the University of Wollongong in New South Wales, Australia. While in Australia, to past extra time, they decided to form a thrash metal band and they frequently perform their music in small concert and gigs primarily in Sydney Metal Scene. They got positive responses and steadily gained their fans, made their name within the Australian Underground Thrash Metal scene rising the ranks along with Australian Godfather bands, the likes of Enticer, SSDC, Mortal Sin, Frozen Doberman, White Trash, Addictive and Detriment. Their single, "Misty" was their most popular song among their fans in those days.

In 1992, Sam, Karl and Miji returned to Malaysia meanwhile Din had already returned to Malaysia the previous year due to an unavoidable personal issue, causing them to loose the spot as Motorhead opening act. After Din went back to Malaysia, they employed the sessionist service of  some of their friend. The rhythm guitarist one of them is a guy named Erwin and the lead guitarist is called Oggy. After returning from Sydney, Cromok performed four concerts at Life Centre in Jalan Sultan Ismail on July 10 to 12, 1992. It become their first major shows since moved back to Malaysia. However, unfortunately and to the chagrin of many early Cromok fans, Din was never invited for the performance and eventual studio recording. This was despite his deep involvement with the Band and instrumental effort in developing the Cromok Bay Area/Nusantara Thrash Metal sound. Their first album/demo which was recorded during their studies, Image of Purity were released in 1990 and were distributed among the tape traders of Australian metal scene and later picked up by Valentine Sound Productions Sdn Bhd to be distributed in Malaysia. They receive positive responses, mostly among the teenagers, and build a huge local fan base in a short period of time. Their songs such as "Another You", "I Don't Belong Here", "Misty", "Metallurgical" and "Memories" were highly praised by their fans. However their success was limited due to limited reception of mainstream media by the Malaysian government at the time (Rock/Heavy Metal/Thrash Metal was unacceptable. Always being discriminated, and banned during late 1980s and early 1990s in Malaysia by Malaysian government and media). Instead, they keep expanding their musical growth, releasing seven more stellar albums; Forever In Time (1993), Yours Truly (1996), Mean, Meaner, Meanest (1999), What's Left? (2000), Deafening Silence (2002), Untitled (2004) and a few special edition compilation. Forever in Time was their most successful album to date, sold over 100,000 copies in Malaysia. A digitally remastered version of their debut album was reissued in 2000.

Khairuddin Muhammad, Din of founder singer-songwriter of the Thrash metal band Cromok and D'Cromok fame died on September 27, 1997, due to Malaria in Mersing, Johor. His remains were buried in Kampung Geting, Tumpat, Kelantan. He was survived by his widow and daughter. Due to some friction between Din and the three others (based on the inlay notes in D'Cromok 7 Years and 7 Days Part 1 and Part 2 albums), the band then continued as a trio. However, in 2001, Karl was seceding from Cromok because he wants to concentrate on his professional career and his family. Karl then was replaced by renowned Malaysian guitar maestro, Hillary Ang from iconic Malaysian rock band, Search.

In April 2005, Cromok performed live at the Planet Hollywood Kuala Lumpur. At the end of 2005, Hillary returned to Search, leaving Sam and Miji as the remaining members in Cromok. Sam then announced that they were going on sabbatical hiatus and all band activities were suspended. After almost five years of sabbatical hiatus from music scene, on April 8, 2012, they held a Reunion concert in Kuala Lumpur, Malaysia at KLive, consisting of three original members (Sam, Karl, and Miji with Shah Ziri from Nrocinu as rhythm guitar sessionist), which also celebrated the band's 25th anniversary. This was one of the latest concert of Cromok, after their last performance in Hard Rock Cafe, Bangkok. On August 21, 2013, Cromok performed as an opening act for Metallica LIVE concert in Malaysia.

On February 3, 2018, Cromok performed alongside XPDC at the Konsert Cromok & XPDC Live in MAEPS, Serdang. That same year, they announced that they will introduced a new concept of Malaysian thrash metal music, which known as Thrashditional, a portmanteau of 'thrash metal' and 'traditional'.

They are now still performing whenever there's demand and the latest concert was NUSAFEST2020, but due to COVID-19 pandemic, it was postponed until further notice.

Style
The band sings in English. They are also known to have at least one instrumental track in every album. Sam uses a teutonic thrash raspy vocal style, sometimes low guttural, while the band's music sounds similar to the Bay Area thrash metal with a touch of Malay/Nusantara feels. Cromok also often experiments with Malay cultural music elements and sounds, adding Malay elements to their artwork. They also known for incorporating unicorn on their album cover.

Members
Founding Members
 Kharuddin Muhammad (Din) - backing vocal, guitarist (1987–1992; died 1997)
 Muhammad Fadhil (Mat Puck) - guitar (1987)
 Che Dean (Denan) - guitar (1987)
 Nik Ramzee (Ji) - bass (1987)

Current members
Shamsudin Ali (Sam) - lead vocals, bass guitar (1987–present)
Tarmizi Mokhtar (Miji) - drums (1987–present)
Khairul Anuar Shariff (Karl) - lead/rhythm guitar (1987–2000; 2010–present)
Shah Sidious (formerly of tribute band Nrocinu)

Former members
 Hillary Ang - lead guitar (2000–2005)

Discography

Studio albums

Live albums

Compilation albums

Other albums

Concerts
Headlining
 Cromok Reunion Thrashing Kuala Lumpur (8 April 2012)
 Konsert Metal Legends Cromok & XPDC (3 February 2018)

Opening act
 Metallica LIVE in Malaysia (21 August 2013)

References

External links
 
 
 

Malaysian thrash metal musical groups
Musical groups established in 1987
Musical groups disestablished in 2006
Musical groups established in 2010
EMI Records artists
English-language singers from Malaysia